INS Tir (A86) (Hindi: Arrow) is the first dedicated cadet's training ship to be built by Mazagon Dock Limited and commissioned as such by the Indian Navy. She is the senior ship of the 1st Training Squadron of the Southern Naval Command.

INS Tir was commissioned on 21 February 1986. Sensors on board Tir include Decca Radar and a SATNAV (Satellite Navigation) system. She can carry up to 293 people on board, though her typical deployment is with 20 instructors and staff and 120 cadets.

Operations

Anti-piracy
On the evening of 5 February 2011, INS Tir was on a training mission west of the Suheli Par atoll in the Lakshadweep archipelago. She was alerted by the Maritime Rescue Coordination Centre (MRCC), Mumbai about Somali pirate activity in the area to her west. INS Tir tracked the pirate skiffs to a hijacked Thai fishing trawler Prantalay 11 being used as a pirate mother ship.

INS Tir was then joined by ICGS Samar of the Indian Coast Guard. When the cadets on board Tir ordered the pirate ship to stop for inspection, they were fired upon. The cadets returned fire in which three pirates were injured, before the pirates raised a white flag and surrendered. 28 pirates were arrested, and the 24 crew of the fishing trawler were rescued unharmed.

See also
Training ships of the Indian Navy

References

External links

 Official web site Of Indian Navy

Training ships of the Indian Navy
1986 ships
Ships built in India